Mulhall-Orlando High School is a public high school located in Orlando, Oklahoma. The school colors are black and gold.

Athletics
The school has multiple sports teams: basketball, baseball, softball and track and field.  Its teams are nicknamed the Panthers.

References

Public high schools in Oklahoma